Sven Johansson may refer to:

Sven Johansson (canoeist) (1912–1953), Swedish sprint canoeist, Olympic winner
Sven Johansson (cyclist) (1914–1982), Swedish cyclist
Sven Johansson (politician) (1916–1987), Swedish politician
Sven Tumba (1931–2011), Swedish ice hockey player, named Sven Johansson before legally changing his name
Sven Johansson (sport shooter) (born 1945), Swedish shooter, Olympic medalist
Sven-Göran Johansson (born 1943), Swedish Olympic swimmer

See also
Sven-Åke Johansson (born 1943), Swedish drummer and composer